Benthomangelia brevis is a species of sea snail, a marine gastropod mollusk in the family Mangeliidae.

Description

Distribution
This marine species was found in the Nazca Ridge, Southeast Pacific

References

 Sysoev A.V. & Ivanov D.L. (1985), New Taxa of Turridae (Gastropoda, Toxoglossa) from the Nazca Ridge (Southeastern Pacific); Zoologicheskii Zhurnal 64(2), p. 194-205 (in Russian, with English summary).

External links
  Tucker, J.K. 2004 Catalog of recent and fossil turrids (Mollusca: Gastropoda). Zootaxa 682:1–1295.

brevis
Gastropods described in 1985